The Vitez massacre was the murder of 8 Croat children by members of the Army of the Republic of Bosnia and Herzegovina (ARBiH) on 10 June 1993, during the Croat–Bosniak War.

Massacre 
On the morning of 10 June 1993 between 8-9:45 pm, a grenade was shot from ARBiH positions ans fell 2 meters away from a playground with 15 children on it. 5 died on impact of the grenade while 3 more were taken to a hospital for serious injuries. 6 other children were also injured. No service was able to catch the massacre in video.

No one has been indicted by the International Criminal Tribunal for the former Yugoslavia (ICTY). A disputed fact is that the children who died played with Muslim children on a daily basis, who did not come to play on the day of the massacre. Therefore, it is suspected that they were warned about a probably planned attack.

References 

1993 in Bosnia and Herzegovina
1993 in Europe